HuffPost (The Huffington Post until 2017; often abbreviated as HuffPo) is an American progressive news website, with localized and international editions. The site offers news, satire, blogs, and original content, and covers politics, business, entertainment, environment, technology, popular media, lifestyle, culture, comedy, healthy living, women's interests, and local news featuring columnists. It was created to provide a progressive alternative to the conservative news websites such as the Drudge Report. The site offers content posted directly on the site as well as user-generated content via video blogging, audio, and photo. In 2012, the website became the first commercially run United States digital media enterprise to win a Pulitzer Prize.

Founded by Andrew Breitbart, Arianna Huffington, Kenneth Lerer, and Jonah Peretti, the site was launched on May 9, 2005 as a counterpart to the Drudge Report. In March 2011, it was acquired by AOL for US$315 million, making Arianna Huffington editor-in-chief. In June 2015, Verizon Communications acquired AOL for US$4.4 billion and the site became a part of Verizon Media. In November 2020, BuzzFeed acquired the company. Weeks after the acquisition, BuzzFeed laid off 47 HuffPost staff in the U.S. (mostly journalists) and closed down HuffPost Canada, laying off 23 staff working for the Canadian and Quebec divisions of the company.

History
The Huffington Post was launched on May 9, 2005, as a commentary outlet, blog, and an alternative to news aggregators such as the Drudge Report. It was founded by Arianna Huffington, Andrew Breitbart, Kenneth Lerer, and Jonah Peretti. Prior to this, Arianna Huffington hosted the website Ariannaonline.com. Her first foray into the Internet was the website Resignation.com, which called for the resignation of President Bill Clinton and was a rallying place for conservatives opposing Clinton.

An early Huffington Post strategy was crafting search-engine optimized (SEO) stories and headlines based around trending keywords, such as "What Time Is the Super Bowl?"

In August 2006, The Huffington Post raised a $5 million Series A round from SoftBank Capital and Greycroft.

In December 2008, The Huffington Post raised $25 million from Oak Investment Partners at a $100 million valuation and Fred Harman of Oak Investment Partners joined its board of directors. The money was to be used for technology, infrastructure, investigative journalism, and development of local versions.

In June 2009, Eric Hippeau, co-managing partner of Softbank Capital, became CEO of The Huffington Post.

In January 2011, The Huffington Post received 35% of its traffic from web search engines, compared to 20% at CNN. This strategy appealed to AOL CEO Tim Armstrong, who tried to implement similar SEO-driven journalism practices at AOL at the time of its acquisition of The Huffington Post.

In March 2011, AOL acquired The Huffington Post for 315 million. As part of the deal, Huffington became president and editor-in-chief of The Huffington Post and existing AOL properties Engadget, TechCrunch, Moviefone, MapQuest, Black Voices, PopEater (now HuffPost Celebrity), AOL Music, AOL Latino (now HuffPost Voices), AutoBlog, Patch, and StyleList.

The Huffington Post subsumed many of AOL's Voices properties, including AOL Black Voices, which was established in 1995 as Blackvoices.com, and AOL Latino, Impact (launched in 2010 as a partnership between Huffington Post and Causecast), Women, Teen, College, Religion, and the Spanish-language Voces (en español). The Voices brand was expanded in September 2011 with the launch of Gay Voices, dedicated to LGBT-relevant articles.

By late 2013, the website operated as a "stand-alone business" within AOL, taking control of more of its own business and advertising operations, and directing more effort towards securing "premium advertising".

In June 2015, Verizon Communications acquired AOL for US$4.4 billion and the site became a part of Verizon Media.

Huffington resigned to pursue other ventures and was succeeded as editor-in-chief by Lydia Polgreen in December 2016.

In April 2017, Polgreen announced the company would rebrand, changing its official full name to HuffPost, with changes also to the design of its website and logo and content and reporting.

On January 24, 2019, 20 employees were laid off as a part of Verizon Media laying off 7% of its staff. The opinion and health sections were eliminated. Pulitzer Prize finalist Jason Cherkis lost his job.

On March 6, 2020, Polgreen announced that she would step down as editor-in-chief to become the head of content at Gimlet Media.

On November 19, 2020, it was announced that BuzzFeed had agreed to acquire HuffPost from Verizon Media in a stock deal. Later in November 2020, HuffPost shut down its India operation after six years. According to some media reports, the acquisition did not include the India site due to regulations barring foreign ownership of Indian Digital Media.

On February 16, 2021, BuzzFeed's acquisition of HuffPost officially closed. On March 9, 2021, BuzzFeed CEO Jonah Peretti said that the company had lost "around $20 million" during the previous year. The same day, it was announced that HuffPost Canada would be shut down and immediately ceased publishing.

On April 12, 2021, Danielle Belton became editor-in-chief.

Local editions
 In spring 2007, the first local version, HuffPost Chicago, was launched.
 In June 2009, HuffPost New York was launched.
 HuffPost Denver launched on September 15, 2009.
 HuffPost Los Angeles launched on December 2, 2009.
 HuffPost San Francisco launched on July 12, 2011.
 HuffPost Detroit launched on November 17, 2011
 HuffPost Miami launched in November 2011.
 HuffPost Hawaii was launched in collaboration with the online investigative reporting and public affairs news service Honolulu Civil Beat on September 4, 2013.

International editions
 On May 26, 2011, HuffPost Canada, the first international edition, was launched. Following BuzzFeed's acquisition of HuffPost, it was announced on March 9, 2021, that HuffPost Canada would stop publishing content and cease operations the following week as part of a broader restructuring plan for the company.
 On July 6, 2011, Huffington Post UK was launched.
 On January 23, 2012, The Huffington Post, in partnership with Le Monde and Les Nouvelles Editions Indépendantes, launched Le Huffington Post, a French-language edition and the first in a non-English speaking country.
 On February 8, 2012, another French language edition was launched in Quebec.
 On May 1, 2012, a U.S.-based Spanish-language edition was launched under the name HuffPost Voces, replacing AOL Latino.
 In June 2012, the edition for Spain, ElHuffPost, was launched.
 On May 6, 2013, an edition for Japan was launched with the collaboration of Asahi Shimbun, the first edition in an Asian country.
 On September 24, 2013, an Italian edition, L'Huffington Post, was launched, directed by journalist Lucia Annunziata in collaboration with the media company Gruppo Editoriale L'Espresso.
 In June 2013, Al Huffington Post, the third francophone edition, launched for the Maghreb French area. On December 3, 2019, the Maghreb edition was closed.
 On October 10, 2013, Munich-based Huffington Post Deutschland was launched in co-operation with the liberal-conservative magazine Focus, covering German-speaking Europe. On January 11, 2018, it was announced that the German language edition would shut down on March 31, 2018.
 In January 2014, Arianna Huffington and Nicolas Berggruen announced the launch of the WorldPost, created in partnership with the Berggruen Institute. Its contributors have included former British prime minister Tony Blair, Google CEO Eric Schmidt, novelist Jonathan Franzen, and musician Yo-Yo Ma.
 On January 29, 2014, the Brazilian version was launched as Brasil Post, in partnership with Grupo Abril, the first in Latin America. Brasil Post was later renamed Huffington Post Brasil in 2015, then HuffPost Brasil. In November 2020, the edition was closed down following BuzzFeed's acquisition.
 In February 2014, a Korean language edition was launched in South Korea in partnership with the local center-left newspaper The Hankyoreh.
 In September 2014, planned launches were announced for sites for Greece, India, as well HuffPost Arabi, an Arabic version of the website. 
 On August 18, 2015, HuffPost Australia was launched.
 On November 21, 2016, HuffPost South Africa, the brand's first sub-Saharan edition, was launched in partnership with Media24. The South African edition stopped when the partnership with Media24 ended in 2018.

Criticism and controversy
Unpaid bloggers
The site originally published work from both paid reporters and unpaid bloggers through its contributor platform.

In February 2011, Visual Art Source, which had been cross-posting material from its website, went on strike against The Huffington Post to protest its writers not being paid. In March 2011, the strike and the call to boycott was joined and endorsed by the National Writers Union and NewsGuild-CWA; however, the boycott was dropped in October 2011.

In April 2011, The Huffington Post was targeted with a multimillion-dollar lawsuit by Jonathan Tasini on behalf of thousands of uncompensated bloggers. On March 30, 2012, the suit was dismissed with prejudice by the court, holding that the bloggers had volunteered their services, their compensation being publication.

In 2015, Wil Wheaton stated that he refused to allow his work to be reused for free on the site.

The practice of publishing blog posts from unpaid contributors ended in January 2018. This transformed the site, which had become notable for featuring extensive sections in a broad range of subjects from a significant number of contributors. Some of the contributors included:

 Adrienne Wu on gender, and species, identity
 Arianna Huffington
 Barack Obama on politics
 Robert Reich on politics
 Catherine, Duchess of Cambridge on mental health issues.
 Harry Shearer on life issues
 Jeff Pollack on music
 Roy Sekoff on politics
 Craig Taro Gold, spiritual author
 Jeff Halevy on health
 Cenk Uygur
 Diane Ravitch on education
 Jacob M. Appel on ethics
 Howard Friedman on statistics and politics
 Auren Hoffman on business and politics
 Cara Santa Maria on science
 Nancy Rappaport on child psychiatry
 Iris Krasnow on marriage
 Anand Reddi publishes on global health
 Radley Balko on civil liberties and the criminal justice system
 Frances Beinecke on climate change and the environment
 Jenna Busch on the entertainment industry
 Jerry Capeci on the mafia
 Margaret Carlson on politics
 Dominic Carter on politics
 Deepak Chopra on integrative medicine and personal transformation
 John Conyers (deceased) on politics
 Danielle Crittenden on Jewish lifestyle
 Laurie David on environmental and food issues
 Andrea Doucet on gender relations
 Ryan Duffy on demographic trends
 Maddy Dychtwald on gender relations
 Ivan Eland on defense
 Mitch Feierstein on the Federal Reserve
 Bruce Fein on law
 Ashley Feinberg on politics, media, and technology
 Michelle Fields on politics
 Rob Fishman on social media
 Myriam François-Cerrah on France and the Middle East
 Dan Froomkin on politics
 Yvonne K. Fulbright on sexuality
 Phil Radford on climate change and the environment
 Lauren Galley on issues important to teen girls
 Mort Gerberg publishes cartoons
 Tim Giago on Native Americans
 Steve Gilliard on politics
 Philip Giraldi on counterterrorism issues
 David Goldstein on politics
 Nathan Gonzalez on foreign policy
 Kent Greenfield on constitutional law, business law, and legal theory
 Anthony Gregory on habeas corpus
 Greg Gutfeld on politics in a comedic taste
 David Hackel on politics
 Leon Hadar on foreign policy
 Katie Halper on politics
 Thor Halvorssen on human rights
 Jane Hamsher on politics
 Aaron Harber on politics
 Johann Hari on drugs and addiction
 David Harsanyi on politics and culture
 Gary Hart on international law
 Mehdi Hasan on the Middle East
 Auren Hoffman on entrepreneurship
 Nicholas von Hoffman on politics
 Paul Holdengräber on the arts
 Hamid Naderi Yeganeh on math art

Alternative medicine and anti-vaccination controversyHuffPost has been criticized for providing a platform for alternative medicine and supporters of vaccine hesitancy. Steven Novella, president of the New England Skeptical Society, criticized The Huffington Post for allowing homeopathy proponent Dana Ullman to have a blog on the site. In 2011, skeptic Brian Dunning listed it at No. 10 on his "Top 10 Worst Anti-Science Websites" list.

 Anne Sinclair appointment to editorial director in France during Strauss-Kahn affair 
In January 2012, The Huffington Post was criticized for naming as editorial director in France the well-known former TV journalist Anne Sinclair because she stood by her husband Dominique Strauss-Kahn, former IMF head, when several women accused him of sexual assault. Commentators at l'Express, Rue89, and Le Monde warned against potential conflict of interest in the French edition's news coverage.

 Apology by the South African edition 
In April 2017, HuffPost South Africa was directed by the press ombud to apologize unreservedly for publishing and later defending a column calling for disenfranchisement of white men which was declared malicious, inaccurate and discriminatory hate speech.

 Jeffrey Epstein 
In July 2019, HuffPost was criticized for publishing a story written by Rachel Wolfson, a publicist, that praised Jeffrey Epstein. Editors later removed the article at the author's request.

Political stanceHuffPost has been seen as a mostly progressive, liberal or liberal-leaning outlet, being described as such by the BBC, CNN, and Politico. Upon becoming the editor-in-chief in December 2016, Lydia Polgreen said that the "wave of intolerance and bigotry that seems to be sweeping the globe" after the election of Donald Trump was remarkable and The Huffington Post has an "absolutely indispensable role to play in this era in human history."

Commenting in 2012 on increased conservative engagement on the website despite its reputation as a liberal news source, The Huffington Post founder Arianna Huffington stated that her website is "increasingly seen" as an Internet newspaper that is "not positioned ideologically in terms of how we cover the news". According to Michael Steel, press secretary for Republican Speaker of the House John Boehner, Republican aides "engage with liberal websites like The Huffington Post [anyway, if for] no other reason than [because] they drive a lot of cable coverage". Jon Bekken, journalism professor at Suffolk University, has cited it as an example of an "advocacy newspaper". The Wall Street Journal editor James Taranto has mockingly referred to it as the "Puffington Host", while Rush Limbaugh referred to it as the "Huffing and Puffington Post".

During the 2016 United States presidential election, HuffPost regularly appended an editor's note to the end of stories about candidate Donald Trump, reading: "Donald Trump regularly incites political violence and is a serial liar, rampant xenophobe, racist, misogynist and birther who has repeatedly pledged to ban all Muslims—1.6 billion members of an entire religion—from entering the U.S." After Trump was elected on November 8, 2016, HuffPost ended this practice to "give respect to the office of the presidency."

Awards
 Won a Pulitzer Prize in 2012 in the category of national reporting for senior military correspondent David Wood's Beyond the Battlefield, a 10-part series about wounded veterans.
 2010 "People's Voice" winner in the 14th Webby Awards. The Huffington Post lost the 2010 Webby Award jury prize for "Best Political Blog" to Truthdig.
 Peabody Award in 2010 for "Trafficked: A Youth Radio Investigation".
 Named second among the "25 Best Blogs of 2009" by Time. Won the 2006 and 2007 Webby Awards for "Best Politics Blog".
 Contributor Bennet Kelley was awarded the Los Angeles Press Club's 2007 Southern California Journalism Award for Online Commentary for political commentary published on the site.
 Ranked the most powerful blog in the world by The Observer in 2008.
 Co-founder Arianna Huffington ranked 12th in the 2009 list of the "Most Influential Women in Media" by Forbes. She was ranked 42nd in the 2009 Top 100 in Media List by The Guardian''.
 Nominated in 2015 for the "Responsible Media of the Year" award at the British Muslim Awards.

References

External links

 
 
 

 
2005 establishments in the United States
American news websites
American political blogs
American political websites
The Hankyoreh
Internet properties established in 2005
Liberalism in the United States
Multilingual websites
News aggregators
News blogs
Peabody Award-winning websites
Progressivism in the United States
BuzzFeed
2020 mergers and acquisitions